"Behold" is a song by Phil Wickham featuring Anne Wilson. The song was released on August 26, 2022, as a standalone single. Wickham co-wrote the song with Dallas Jenkins and Steven Furtick. Jonathan Smith produced the single.

"Behold" peaked at number eight on the US Hot Christian Songs chart.

Background
On August 26, 2022, Phil Wickham released "Behold" featuring Anne Wilson as a single. Wickham also announced the Behold Christmas Nights Tour, presented by Transparent Productions, and joined by Anne Wilson and Brandon Lake as special guests. The tour began at the Capital Christian Center in Sacramento on December 8, 2022, and concluded at the Maranatha Chapel in San Diego on December 11, 2022.

Writing and development
Wickham shared that the song had been written during the Christmas season of 2021 and he wanted to sing with someone else. Wickham decided on working with Anne Wilson after hearing her single, "My Jesus," on the radio.

Composition

Critical reception
Jonathan Andre, reviewing for 365 Days of Inspiring Media review, gave a positive remarks about the song, saying ""Behold" is a great song full of Biblical truth and lyrical richness," and further added that it "continues to remind us of how much of a powerful singer-songwriter Phil himself is, as he continues to assert himself to become a great worship artist alternative."

Commercial performance
"Behold" made its debut at number 27 on the US Christian Airplay chart dated December 3, 2022. The song peaked at number two on the Christian Airplay chart.

"Behold" debuted at number 17 on the US Hot Christian Songs chart dated December 3, 2022, concurrently charting at number 15 on the Christian Digital Song Sales chart. The song peaked at number eight on the Hot Christian Songs chart.

Music videos
Phil Wickham availed the audio video of "Behold" through YouTube on August 26, 2022. On November 4, 2022, Phil Wickham released the official lyric video of the song on YouTube. Phil Wickham published the official music video for "Behold" featuring Anne Wilson on November 14, 2022, via YouTube. On December 17, 2022, Phil Wickham released the live performance video of the song featuring Anne Wilson on YouTube.

Charts

Release history

References

External links
 
 

2022 singles
2022 songs
Phil Wickham songs
Anne Wilson songs
Songs written by Phil Wickham
Songs written by Steven Furtick